Julio Eduardo Barraza (born April 3, 1980) is an Argentine football defender who plays for Crucero del Norte.

Career

Barraza made his professional debut for Banfield in 2000, and went on to make over 200 appearances for the club (counting league and international competitions). In 2009, he was part of the squad that won the Argentine Primera División championship for the first time in the club's history, clinching the 2009 Apertura tournament on the final day of the season.

After 11 years playing professional football for Banfield, Barraza joined Colón for the 2011–12 Argentine Primera División season.

In winter 2014, he signs for Crucero del Norte with the goal of promoting to the Argentine First Division which he accomplished.

Honours
Banfield
Primera División Argentina: Apertura 2009

References

External links
 Argentine Primera statistics at Fútbol XXI  

1980 births
Living people
Footballers from Santa Fe, Argentina
Argentine footballers
Association football defenders
Club Atlético Banfield footballers
Club Atlético Colón footballers
Argentinos Juniors footballers
Argentine Primera División players